The 2009 Chiba Lotte Marines season features the Marines quest to win their first Pacific League title since 2005.

Regular season

Standings

Game log

|-align="center" bgcolor="#ffbbbb"
| 1 || April 3 || Lions || 2 - 5 || Wakui (1-0) || Shimizu (0-1) || Graman (1) || 30,041 || 0-1-0
|-align="center" bgcolor="bbffbb"
| 2 || April 4 || Lions || 10 - 5 || Komiyama (1-0) || Hoashi (0-1) ||  || 26,819 || 1-1-0
|-align="center" bgcolor="bbffbb"
| 3 || April 5 || Lions || 6 - 5 || Sikorski (1-0) || Graman (0-1) ||  || 24,313 || 2-1-0
|-align="center" bgcolor="#ffbbbb"
| 4 || April 7 || @Fighters || 9 - 1 || Tadano (1-0) || Karakawa (0-1) ||  || 17,568 || 2-2-0
|-align="center" bgcolor="#ffbbbb"
| 5 || April 8 || @Fighters || 8 - 7 || Tateyama (1-0) || Sikorski (1-1) || Takeda (1) || 18,853 || 2-3-0
|-align="center" bgcolor="#ffbbbb"
| 6 || April 10 || @Buffaloes || 10 - 8 || Katsuki (1-0) || Shimizu (0-2) ||  || 27,827 || 2-4-0
|-align="center" bgcolor="#ffbbbb"
| 7 || April 11 || @Buffaloes || 5 - 2 || Kondo (2-0) || Kobayashi (0-1) || Kato (2) || 30,444 || 2-5-0
|-align="center" bgcolor="#ffbbbb"
| 8 || April 12 || @Buffaloes || 4 - 1 || Kishida (1-0) || Ono (0-1) || Kato (3) || 31,597 || 2-6-0
|-align="center" bgcolor="#ffbbbb"
| 9 || April 14 || Eagles || 1 - 2 || Tanaka (2-0) || Watanabe (0-1) ||  || 9,247 || 2-7-0
|-align="center" bgcolor="bbffbb"
| 10 || April 15 || Eagles || 7 - 1 || Karakawa (1-1) || Asai (0-2) ||  || 16,235 || 3-7-0
|-align="center" bgcolor="bbffbb"
| 11 || April 16 || Eagles || 11 - 7 (10) || Sikorski (2-1) || Koyama (0-1) ||  || 13,984 || 4-7-0
|-align="center" bgcolor="bbffbb"
| 12 || April 17 || Hawks || 2 - 1 (11) || Ogino (1-0) || Settsu (0-1) ||  || 10,367 || 5-7-0
|-align="center" bgcolor="#ffbbbb"
| 13 || April 18 || Hawks || 4 - 7 || Kume (1-0) || Ito (0-1) || Mahara (2) || 23,225 || 5-8-0
|-align="center" bgcolor="#ffbbbb"
| 14 || April 19 || Hawks || 5 - 12 || Sugiuchi (2-0) || Kobayashi (0-2) ||  || 25,537 || 5-9-0
|-align="center" bgcolor="#bbbbbb"
| — || April 21 || @Eagles || colspan=6|Postponed (rained out)
|-align="center" bgcolor="#ffbbbb"
| 15 || April 22 || @Eagles || 2 - 0 || Tanaka (3-0) || Watanabe (0-2) ||  || 12,909 || 5-10-0
|-align="center" bgcolor="bbffbb"
| 16 || April 23 || @Eagles || 2 - 5 || Ono (1-1) || Hasebe (0-2) || Ogino (1) || 11,444 || 6-10-0
|-align="center" bgcolor="#ffbbbb"
| 17 || April 24 || @Lions || 3 - 1 || Wakui (3-1) || Karakawa (1-2) ||  || 12,618 || 6-11-0
|-align="center" bgcolor="bbffbb"
| 18 || April 25 || @Lions || 2 - 3 || Naruse (1-0) || Hoashi (0-2) || Ogino (2) || 23,147 || 7-11-0
|-align="center" bgcolor="bbffbb"
| 19 || April 26 || @Lions || 5 - 11 || Omine (1-0) || Wasdin (0-2) ||  || 23,647 || 8-11-0
|-align="center" bgcolor="#ffbbbb"
| 20 || April 28 || Buffaloes || 3 - 4 || Kato (2-0) || Sikorski (2-2) ||  || 13,198 || 8-12-0
|-align="center" bgcolor="#ffbbbb"
| 21 || April 29 || Buffaloes || 3 - 5 || Kaneko (2-2) || Watanabe (0-3) || Kato (5) || 24,756 || 8-13-0
|-align="center" bgcolor="bbffbb"
| 22 || April 30 || Buffaloes || 5 - 2 || Ito (1-1) || Kikuchihara (0-1) ||  || 12,212 || 9-13-0
|-

|-align="center" bgcolor="#ffbbbb"
| 23 || May 1 || @Hawks || 6 - 2 || Wada (2-2) || Ono (1-2) ||  || 26,830 || 9-14-0
|-align="center" bgcolor="bbffbb"
| 24 || May 2 || @Hawks || 4 - 9 || Karakawa (2-2) || Arakaki (0-1) ||  || 30,239 || 10-14-0
|-align="center" bgcolor="#ffbbbb"
| 25 || May 3 || @Hawks || 7 - 2 || Sugiuchi (3-1) || Naruse (1-1) ||  || 34,040 || 10-15-0
|-align="center" bgcolor="#ffbbbb"
| 26 || May 4 || Fighters || 7 - 10 || Tadano (2-2) || Omine (1-1) || Takeda (6) || 30,058 || 10-16-0
|-align="center" bgcolor="#ffbbbb"
| 27 || May 5 || Fighters || 0 - 2 (5) || Yagi (2-0) || Kobayashi (0-3) ||  || 22,726 || 10-17-0
|-align="center" bgcolor="bbffbb"
| 28 || May 6 || Fighters || 7 - 3 || Watanabe (1-3) || Sweeney (0-3) ||  || 23,139 || 11-17-0
|-align="center" bgcolor="bbffbb"
| 29 || May 8 || Eagles || 4 - 3 || Shimizu (1-2) || Nagai (3-1) || Ogino (3) || 13,263 || 12-17-0
|-align="center" bgcolor="#ffbbbb"
| 30 || May 9 || Eagles || 2 - 6 || Iwakuma (4-1) || Ono (1-3) ||  || 24,668 || 12-18-0
|-align="center" bgcolor="bbffbb"
| 31 || May 10 || Eagles || 6 - 0 || Karakawa (3-2) || Rasner (2-2) ||  || 24,023 || 13-18-0
|-align="center" bgcolor="bbffbb"
| 32 || May 12 || @Hawks || 1 - 2 || Naruse (2-1) || Houlton (2-3) || Ogino (4) || 25,231 || 14-18-0
|-align="center" bgcolor="bbffbb"
| 33 || May 13 || @Hawks || 0 - 7 || Omine (2-1) || Otonari (1-3) ||  || 16,242 || 15-18-0
|-align="center" bgcolor="#ffbbbb"
| 34 || May 14 || @Hawks || 5 - 4 || Falkenborg (1-0) || Ogino (1-1) ||  || 29,671 || 15-19-0
|-align="center" bgcolor="#ffbbbb"
| 35 || May 15 || Lions || 0 - 18 || Wakui (4-1) || Watanabe (1-4) ||  || 17,567 || 15-20-0
|-align="center" bgcolor="bbffbb"
| 36 || May 16 || Lions || 6 - 4 || Ito (2-1) || Onuma (1-2) || Ogino (5) || 20,074 || 16-20-0
|-align="center" bgcolor="bbffbb"
| 37 || May 17 || Lions || 8 - 5 || Ono (2-3) || Hirano (0-1) || Ogino (6) || 14,363 || 17-20-0
|-align="center" bgcolor="bbffbb"
| 38 || May 19 || BayStars || 2 - 1 || Karakawa (4-2) || Ishii (0-5) ||  || 16,387 || 18-20-0
|-align="center" bgcolor="#ffbbbb"
| 39 || May 20 || BayStars || 1 - 4 || Walrond (3-3) || Naruse (2-2) || Yamaguchi (2-2) || 17,019 || 18-21-0
|-align="center" bgcolor="#ffbbbb"
| 40 || May 22 || Dragons || 1 - 4 || Yoshimi (4-2) || Omine (2-2) || Iwase (10) || 14,660 || 18-22-0
|-align="center" bgcolor="bbffbb"
| 41 || May 23 || Dragons || 2 - 1 || Sikorski (3-2) || Hirai (0-1) ||  || 28,117 || 19-22-0
|-align="center" bgcolor="#bbbbbb"
| — || May 24 || @Tigers || colspan=6|No game (called after 4 innings)
|-align="center" bgcolor="#ffbbbb"
| 42 || May 25 || @Tigers || 4 - 3 || Kubo (1-2) || Shimizu (1-3) || Fujikawa (3) || 43,474 || 19-23-0
|-align="center" bgcolor="bbffbb"
| 43 || May 26 || @Tigers || 2 - 3 || Sikorski (4-2) || Fujikawa (1-3) || Ogino (7) || 26,680 || 20-23-0
|-align="center" bgcolor="#ffbbbb"
| 44 || May 27 || @Carp || 8 - 3 || Maeda (3-5) || Karakawa (4-3) ||  || 22,513 || 20-24-0
|-align="center" bgcolor="#ffbbbb"
| 45 || May 28 || @Carp || 4 - 3 || Lewis (3-2) || Kobayashi (0-4) || Nagakawa (14) || 12,048 || 20-25-0
|-align="center" bgcolor="bbffbb"
| 46 || May 30 || Swallows || 6 - 3 || Naruse (3-2) || Tanaka (0-1) ||  || 15,431 || 21-25-0
|-align="center" bgcolor="#ffbbbb"
| 47 || May 31 || Swallows || 1 - 7 || Kawashima (4-3) || Omine (2-3) ||  || 27,310 || 21-26-0
|-

|-align="center" bgcolor="bbbbbb"
| 48 || June 2 || Giants || 0 - 0 (12) || colspan=3|Game tied after 12 innings || 25,249 || 21-26-1
|-
| 49 || June 3 || Giants ||  ||  ||  ||  ||  || 
|-
| 50 || June 5 || @Dragons ||  ||  ||  ||  ||  || 
|-
| 51 || June 6 || @Dragons ||  ||  ||  ||  ||  || 
|-
| 52 || June 7 || @BayStars ||  ||  ||  ||  ||  || 
|-
| 53 || June 8 || @BayStars ||  ||  ||  ||  ||  || 
|-
| 54 || June 10 || Carp ||  ||  ||  ||  ||  || 
|-
| 55 || June 11 || Carp ||  ||  ||  ||  ||  || 
|-
| 56 || June 13 || Tigers ||  ||  ||  ||  ||  || 
|-
| 57 || June 14 || Tigers ||  ||  ||  ||  ||  || 
|-
| 58 || June 17 || @Swallows ||  ||  ||  ||  ||  || 
|-
| 59 || June 18 || @Swallows ||  ||  ||  ||  ||  || 
|-
| 60 || June 20 || @Giants ||  ||  ||  ||  ||  || 
|-
| 61 || June 21 || @Giants ||  ||  ||  ||  ||  || 
|-
| 62 || June 26 || Fighters ||  ||  ||  ||  ||  || 
|-
| 63 || June 27 || Fighters ||  ||  ||  ||  ||  || 
|-
| 64 || June 28 || Fighters ||  ||  ||  ||  ||  || 
|-
| 65 || June 30 || @Lions ||  ||  ||  ||  ||  || 
|-

Player stats

Batting

Pitching

References

Chiba Lotte Marines
Chiba Lotte Marines seasons